Ministry of Industry is an Indonesian ministry. The ministry is under, and is responsible to, the President of Indonesia.

History 
The industrial portfolio was under Ministry of Welfare from 1945 to 1950. In 1950, industrial portfolio was under Ministry of Trade and Industry. After 1952, industrial portfolio was part of portfolios under Ministry of Economic Affairs. In 1959, industrial portfolio was part of portfolios under Ministry of Industry. After 1952, industrial portfolio was divided into 2 departments, those are Department of Basic Industry and Mining and Department of People's Industry.

Responsibilities 
The ministry's functions are:
 coordination and synchronization of formulation, determination, and execution of ministerial policy in industry
 execution of technical guidance and supervision of policy implementation in industry
 research and development in industry
 implementation of substantial and administrative support in ministerial organization
 management of state assets under the responsibility of the ministry

Organization 
The ministry is organized as follows:
 Deputy Minister's Office
 Secretariat General
 Directorate General of Agricultural Industries
 Directorate General of Chemical, Pharmacy, and Textile Industries
 Directorate General of Metal, Machinery, Transportation and Electronics Industries
 Directorate General of Small and Medium Industries
 Directorate General of Industrial Region Development
 Directorate General of Resilience and International Industrial Access Development 
 Inspectorate General
 Agency of Industrial Research and Development
 Special Advisor to the Minister on Industrial Structure Reinforcement
 Special Advisor to the Minister on Local Product Usage Enhancement
 Special Advisor to the Minister on Industrial Resource

References 

Government ministries of Indonesia
Indonesia